Pune Warriors India (PWI) was a Pune-based franchise cricket team that participated in the Indian Premier League (IPL). They played their first Twenty20 match in the 2011 season of the IPL against Kings XI Punjab. PWI played in three editions of the IPL, failing to reach the playoffs on all occasions. They came last in the 2012 IPL, and came second-last in the 2011 and the 2013 IPL. After the 2013 season, PWI owners withdrew from the IPL due to financial differences with the Board of Control for Cricket in India. In total, 46 players had played for PWI, of whom Robin Uthappa had played the most matches (46, since his debut for the franchise in 2011).

The leading run-scorer for PWI was Uthappa, who had scored 1,103 runs. Jesse Ryder scored 86 runs against Delhi Daredevils in 2012, which was the highest individual score in an innings by a PWI batsman. Steve Smith had the team's best batting average: 40.07. Among PWI's bowlers, Rahul Sharma had taken more wickets than any other, claiming 34. The best bowling average among bowlers who had bowled more than 20 overs was Yuvraj Singh's 22.93. Ashok Dinda had the best bowling figures in an innings; he claimed four wickets against Mumbai Indians in a 2012 match, conceding 18 runs. Uthappa had taken the most catches as wicket-keeper for PWI, with 24, and had also made the most stumpings: six. Smith and Manish Pandey had claimed the highest number of catches among fielders, taking 14 each.

The list includes all players who have played in at least one match for PWI and is initially listed alphabetically by their last name. Many players have also represented other teams of the IPL, but only the records of their games for PWI are given.

Key

Players

To sort the table by any statistic, click on the  icon in the column title.

See also
Sahara India Pariwar

Notes

Footnotes

References

Pune-related lists
Sport in Pune
Lists of Indian Premier League cricketers
Cricket in Pune